This is a list of members of the Western Australian Legislative Council from 22 May 1977 to 21 May 1980. The chamber had 32 seats made up of 16 provinces each electing two members, on a system of rotation whereby one-half of the members would retire at each triennial election. A new province, East Metropolitan, was added at the 1977 election. During the term, the National Country Party split in two over the issue of coalition with the Liberal Party, with supporters of the Coalition remaining in the National Country Party (NCP), and opponents creating a new National Party (NP). They reunited in 1985.

Sources
 
 
 

Members of Western Australian parliaments by term